WisdomTools Enterprises, Inc. (WT), formerly known as Information In Place, Inc, (IIPI) is a serious game developer and e-learning company.

WT has developed or is in the process of developing hazmat games, K-20 serious games, space games and a virtual Congress game.

Subsidiaries 
 On March 5, 2009, IIPI announced the acquisition of WisdomTools, a venture-backed company that was the first spin-out of Indiana University.  IIPI acquired all the assets and customer contracts of WisdomTools, Inc. and formed WisdomTools, LLC, which is a single member limited liability corporation.
 In March 2008, IIPI founded Holutions, Inc., a C corporation, led by Matthew Burton, M.D. for the purposes of offering health care solutions in workflow and training areas to hospitals.

Serious game announcements 
 On February 18, 2009, it was reported that WisdomTools Enterprises, Inc., and its partners Virtual Heroes, Inc. and Project Whitecard, were selected by NASA to build the NASA MMO: Astronaut: Moon, Mars and Beyond, a Massively multiplayer online game for promoting learning in science, technology, engineering and mathematics (STEM) fields.

References

External links 
 WisdomTools Enterprises Inc. official website
 KMI MT2 Top 100 2007 List

Software companies established in 1999
Video game development companies
Video game companies of the United States
1999 establishments in Indiana